The Snake River is a river in Canada, located in northeastern British Columbia, 3,400 km west of Canada's capital city, Ottawa. The area around the Snake River grows mainly boreal (pine) forest, and is almost uninhabited, with less than two inhabitants per square kilometre. It lies in the boreal (subarctic) climate zone. The annual average temperature is −2 °C. The warmest month is July, when the average temperature is 16 °C, and the coldest is January, with −21 °C.

See also
List of rivers of British Columbia (alphabetical)
List of rivers of British Columbia (by watershed)

References

Rivers of British Columbia
Peace River Land District